The Political Parties Order, 2002 was an executive order in Pakistan stating that any person can become a member of a political party as long as they are not in the service of Pakistan and that a person cannot become a political party office-bearer if they are disqualified from being a parliamentarian by Articles 62 and 63 of the Constitution of Pakistan. The order was repealed by the Election Act, 2017.

References

Repealed Pakistani legislation